199 Byblis (minor planet designation: 199 Byblis) is a medium-sized main belt asteroid.

It was discovered by C. H. F. Peters on July 9, 1879, in Clinton, New York and named after Byblis, an incestuous lover in Greek mythology.

References

External links
 
 

Background asteroids
Byblis
Byblis
X-type asteroids (SMASS)
18790709